Kanyakumari is an Indian television drama in the Kannada language that premiered on Colors Kannada on 9 August 2021 and ended on 23 September 2022 with 325 episodes. It stars Asiya Firdose, Yashwanth and Rashmitha J.Shetty in the lead roles. The show also premiers on Voot.

Plot summary 
The sprightly & simple Kannika, born into an affluent family, has a Divine Power that she is unaware of. Her heart has no want for riches and she falls in love with Charan, a cab driver from a slum she often visits. Life takes a big turn for the couple when Yamini comes in search of the divine power to take for her own. The way how Charan and Kannika fight back with Yaamini forms the rest of the story.

Cast

Main 
 Asiya Firdose as Kannika Aras; Daughter of Shekhar Aras and Kalpana Aras and Charan's love interest
 Yashwanth as Charan; Cab driver and Kannika's love interest
 Rashmitha J.Shetty as Yaamini

Recurring 
 Swathi as Kalpana Aras, Shekar Aras's wife and Kannika and Dhruva's mother
 Preetham M.N. as Shekhar Aras; Kalpana Aras's husband and Kannika and Dhruva's father
 Nakul Sharma as Dhruva Aras; Kalpana and Shekhar's son and Kannika's brother
 Yamuna Srinidhi as Dhanalakshmi; Charan's mother
 Rishika as Aishu; Charan's sister
 Sahana Annappa as Bhagya Lakshmi
 Saanvi as Bhagyalakshmi's daughter
 Harsharjun as Ranganath; Bhagyalaksmi's husband
 Yadhunandan as Abhi; Charan's brother
 Dileep K gowda as Shridhar; Charan's friend

Dubbed versions

Production 
The show marks the debut of actors Asiya and Yashwanth as the leads of the show. The show is being shot in and around Bengaluru. Some episodes of the show have been filmed in the outskirts of Bengaluru.The show is directed and also produced by Raghucharan Tiptur.

Soundtrack 
The title song for the series Kanyakumari has been sung by singer Preethu Bhat. The original music has been given by Hamsalekha.

References 

2021 Indian television series debuts
Colors Kannada original programming
Kannada-language television shows